Raúl Lena (born: 23 June 1954) is a sailor from Argentina. who represented his country at the 1988 Summer Olympics in Busan, South Korea as crew member in the Soling. With helmsman Santiago Lange and fellow crew members Pedro Ferrero they took the 9th place.

References

Living people
1954 births
Sailors at the 1988 Summer Olympics – Soling
Olympic sailors of Argentina
Argentine male sailors (sport)